Hamilton Hotel may refer to:

Hamilton Hotel (St. Louis), listed on the National Register of Historic Places (NRHP) in St. Louis County, Missouri
Hamilton Hotel (Portland, Oregon), former hotel in downtown Portland, Oregon
Hamilton Hotel, Laredo, Texas, listed on the NRHP in Webb County, Texas
Hamilton Hotel, former name for the Omaha Hotel, listed on the NRHP in Clark County, Wisconsin
Hamilton Hotel (Washington, D.C.), listed on the NRHP in Washington, D.C.
Hamilton Hotel (Bermuda)